Lorensberga is a school in Ludvika, Sweden. The school lies south of the city center. With construction first commenced in 1952, the school has gone through several periods of restoration and expansion, the biggest one between 1999 and 2003.

The school was first built in the early 1950s. The oldest of the buildings are from 1952 and then work progressed all the way to 1958. Some rebuilding was made in 1965 and between 1999 and 2003 a lot of work has been made. During the last period, the dining hall was rebuilt and therefore all pupils were forced to eat in the classrooms.

Lorensberga also has a school newspaper, entitled Zezam. With all the nine buildings together, the school contains the following:
 24 classrooms
 An aula
 A library
 A dining hall
 Two classrooms for home economics
 Four classrooms for handicraft

External links
Both webpages are in Swedish
 Lorensberga Official Site
 Lorensberga School Newspaper (Zezam)

Schools in Sweden